Agron Limani is a Kosovo-Albanian politician and former commander of the KLA.

Early life
Agron Limani was born on 15 December 1966 in Krusha e Vogël, at the time part of Yugoslavia. In 1986 he was admitted to the Faculty of Engineering at the University of Pristina and finished it in 1991. From 1993 to 2005 he worked as a professor of physics in the Gymnasium "Gjon Buzuku" in Prizren. From 2005 to 2006 he also worked as an engineer at "M& Sillosi".

Kosovo War
Following the outbreak of the Kosovo War, Limani was appointed as commander in the 124th Brigade of the KLA. Limani was also a victim of the Krusha massacres, and he would later appear in the Kosovo Specialist Chambers as a witness.

Political career
Following the war, Limani would become an activist of the left-wing Lëvizja Vetëvendosje movement. He would be appointed Head of the Department of Agriculture and Rural Development of Prizren in July 2020. He would hold the office for just over 1 year, following the 2021 Kosovan local elections, the PDK party would win in Prizren.

References

1966 births
Living people